Tribal Style may refer to:
American Tribal Style Belly Dance
Improv Tribal Style Belly Dance
Tribal Fusion